Beginnings may refer to:

Literature
 Beginnings (collection), a 1988 collection of short stories and poems by Gordon R. Dickson
 Beginnings (Honorverse), a 2013 collection of short stories in the Worlds of Honor series
 Beginnings (novella), by Laurie R. King (2019)
 "The Beginnings", a 1917 poem by Rudyard Kipling

Music

Albums
 Beginnings (The Allman Brothers Band album), 1973
 Beginnings (Ambrose Slade album), 1969
 Beginnings (Happy the Man album), 1990
 Beginnings (Memento album) or the title song, 2003
 Beginnings (Meredith Monk album), 2009
 Beginnings (Rick Springfield album), 1972
 Beginnings (Steve Howe album) or the title song, 1975
 Beginnings (Trevor Rabin album), 1977
 Beginnings: Greatest Hits & New Songs, by Cilla Black, 2003
 Beginnings: Nimmons'n'Braid, 2005
 Beginnings: The Best of the Early Years, by Clannad, 2008
 Beginnings: The Lost Tapes 1988–1991, by Tupac Shakur, 2007
 Beginnings, by Morris Albert, 1983

Songs
 "Beginnings" (Chicago song), 1969
 "Beginnings", by Jimi Hendrix from Midnight Lightning, 1975
 "Beginnings", by Mark Gormley, 2009

Television episodes 
 "Beginnings" (Fraggle Rock)
 "Beginnings" (The Legend of Korra)
 "Beginnings" (Power Rangers S.P.D.)
 "Beginnings" (Spaced)

See also
 Begin (disambiguation)
 Beginning (disambiguation)